The 1150s was a decade of the Julian Calendar which began on January 1, 1150, and ended on December 31, 1159.

Significant people
 Pope Eugene III
 Pope Adrian IV
 Al-Muqtafi

References